Lyubov Petrovna Rusanova (born 2 February 1954) is a retired Russian swimmer who won two medals in the 100 and 200 m breaststroke events at the 1976 Summer Olympics. She also won a silver medal in the 100 m breaststroke at the 1973 World Aquatics Championships.

Her father was a locksmith and mother worked at a kindergarten. They had four children: elder brothers Vasily and Nikolai, and twins Anatoly and Lyubov; all four competed in swimming, though brother Anatoly quit at a young age. There was no pool in Krasnodar until 1967, and therefore they trained in the Kuban River, which was heated all through the year by the nearby thermal power station. She graduated from the Kuban State University of Physical Education in Krasnodar. After retiring in 1976 she worked as a swimming coach. In the 2000s she was still competing in the masters category.

References

1954 births
Living people
Russian female breaststroke swimmers
Soviet female breaststroke swimmers
Olympic swimmers of the Soviet Union
Swimmers at the 1976 Summer Olympics
Olympic silver medalists for the Soviet Union
Olympic bronze medalists for the Soviet Union
Olympic bronze medalists in swimming
Sportspeople from Krasnodar
World Aquatics Championships medalists in swimming
Medalists at the 1976 Summer Olympics
Olympic silver medalists in swimming
Universiade medalists in swimming
Universiade gold medalists for the Soviet Union
Medalists at the 1973 Summer Universiade